Scotland competed in the 2014 Commonwealth Games as the host nation in Glasgow from 23 July to 3 August 2014. A team of 310 athletes, consisting of 168 men and 142 women, were selected to compete in 17 disciplines.

Medalists

| style="text-align:left; vertical-align:top;"|

Athletics

Men
Track & road events

Field events

Women
Track & road events

Field events

Badminton

Individual

Mixed team

Pool C

Quarterfinals

Boxing

Men

Cycling

Mountain biking

Road
Men

Women

Track
Keirin

Points race

Pursuit

Scratch

Sprint

Time trial

Diving

Men

Women

Gymnastics

Artistic

Men
All-around

Individual Finals

Women
All-around

Individual Finals

Rhythmic
Team

Individual

Hockey

Men's tournament

Pool A

Women's tournament

Pool B

Judo

Men

Women

Lawn bowls

Men

Women

Para-bowls

Netball

Pool A

Rugby sevens

Pool A

Quarterfinal

Shooting

Men

Women

Open

Squash

Individual

Doubles

Swimming
Men

Women

 Aisha Thornton finished in equal tenth position in the heats alongside New Zealand's Emma Robinson. Robinson defeated Thornton by less than a second in a swim-off between the two competitors to determine the second reserve for the final.
Qualifiers for the latter rounds (Q) of all events were decided on a time only basis, therefore positions shown are overall results versus competitors in all heats.
* – Indicates athlete swam in the preliminaries but not in the final race.

Table tennis

Singles

Doubles

Team

Triathlon

Mixed Relay

Weightlifting

Men

Women

Powerlifting

Wrestling

Men's freestyle

Women's freestyle

References

Nations at the 2014 Commonwealth Games
Scotland at the Commonwealth Games
2014 in Scottish sport